NGC 6819 is an open cluster (commonly known as an "open star cluster") located 7,200 light years away in the Cygnus constellation. It was discovered by Caroline Herschel on 12 May 1784.

Situated on the boundary of Cygnus and Lyra, NGC 6819 contains roughly two dozen stars of magnitude 10 to 12, with many more lower magnitude members.

The age of NGC 6819 is estimated here to be ~ 2.5 ± 0.5 Gyr. Its distance is calculated to be 2.16 ± 0.57 kpc.

References

External links
 
 NGC 6819 at SEDS
 NGC 6819 at Silicon Owl
 NGC 6819 at Messier45
 

NGC 6819
NGC 6819
6819
17840512
Discoveries by Caroline Herschel